Tim Matavž (born 13 January 1989) is a Slovenian professional footballer who plays as a forward for Croatian club Gorica.

Club career

Matavž began his football career at the age of 6 playing for Bilje. In 2004, he moved to Gorica youth squads. He was promoted to their senior squad in the 2006–07 season and played a total of 30 matches in the Slovenian first division, scoring 11 goals in the process.

On 30 August 2007, at the age of 18, he signed a five-year contract for Groningen. On 26 September 2007 he scored four goals in KNVB Cup in a match against IJsselmeervogels, but later moved to Emmen on loan and remained there until January 2009.

On 13 March 2009 Matavž scored his first goal in the Eredivisie in a 2–0 victory over Roda. Soon he began scoring for Groningen on regular basis in all competitions. On 24 February 2010 Matavž extended his contract with club until 2013. On 6 February 2011, in a match against Willem II, Matavž scored his first hat-trick in the Eredivisie.

On 2 February 2011, Groningen sporting director Hans Nijland said that Matavž had already agreed terms with Napoli and that he was looking forward to joining them.
However, Eredivisie side PSV Eindhoven were also in talks with Groningen to buy him before the transfer window closed. On 31 August 2011, Matavž eventually signed a five-year contract with PSV.

On 29 June 2017, Matavž returned to the Netherlands, to join Vitesse on a three-year deal.

On 19 July 2020, Matavž joined Al Wahda on a two-year deal.

International career
On 9 October 2010, Matavž scored a hat-trick for Slovenia in the UEFA Euro 2012 qualifying match against Faroe Islands. At the age of 21, he became the youngest player ever to score three goals for Slovenia.

Personal life
Matavž was born in Šempeter pri Gorici, Slovenia (then part of Yugoslavia). He is the cousin of fellow footballer Etien Velikonja. In June 2014, Matavž married his long-term partner Polona. He has two daughters, Tia (born 2012) and Ela (born 2015), and one son, Val (born 2017). Beside Slovene, Matavž is also fluent in Dutch.

Career statistics

Club

International
Scores and results list Slovenia's goal tally first, score column indicates score after each Matavž goal.

Honours
PSV
KNVB Cup: 2011–12
Johan Cruijff Shield: 2012

Omonia
Cypriot Cup: 2021–22

References

External links

 
 
 
 
 NZS profile 

1989 births
Living people
People from Šempeter pri Gorici
Slovenian footballers
Association football forwards
ND Gorica players
FC Groningen players
FC Emmen players
PSV Eindhoven players
Jong PSV players
FC Augsburg players
Genoa C.F.C. players
1. FC Nürnberg players
SBV Vitesse players
Al Wahda FC players
Bursaspor footballers
AC Omonia players
HNK Gorica players
Slovenian PrvaLiga players
Eredivisie players
Eerste Divisie players
Bundesliga players
Serie A players
2. Bundesliga players
UAE Pro League players
TFF First League players
Cypriot First Division players
Croatian Football League players
2010 FIFA World Cup players
Slovenian expatriate footballers
Slovenian expatriate sportspeople in the Netherlands
Expatriate footballers in the Netherlands
Slovenian expatriate sportspeople in Germany
Expatriate footballers in Germany
Slovenian expatriate sportspeople in Italy
Expatriate footballers in Italy
Expatriate footballers in the United Arab Emirates
Slovenian expatriate sportspeople in Turkey
Expatriate footballers in Turkey
Slovenian expatriate sportspeople in Cyprus
Expatriate footballers in Cyprus
Slovenian expatriate sportspeople in Croatia
Expatriate footballers in Croatia
Slovenia youth international footballers
Slovenia under-21 international footballers
Slovenia international footballers